VDB or VdB may refer to:

People
 Victor David Brenner, designer of U.S. one-cent coin bearing Abraham Lincoln's image
 Paul Vanden Boeynants, Belgian prime minister
 Frank Vandenbroucke (cyclist)
 Vicente del Bosque, former Spanish footballer, currently manager of the Spain national football team.
 Alexander Van der Bellen, Austrian politician and economist
 Donny van de Beek, Dutch footballer playing for Manchester United.

Science & Engineering 
 dBV, voltage measurement on a decibel scale
 VDB Catalog, list of reflection nebulae compiled by Sidney van den Bergh
 Video Data Bank, video art distribution service of the Art Institute of Chicago

Computers & Technology 
 dBase, abbreviated as VdB
 , the installed package database in FreeBSD and Gentoo Linux

Other
 VDB, IATA code for Fagernes Airport, Leirin, Norway
 Volksdeutsche Bewegung, a former political party in Luxembourg
 Vrijzinnig Democratische Bond, a Dutch political party